The Avro Vulcan is a British jet-engine strategic bomber operated by the Royal Air Force from 1956 until 1984. Of the 134 production Vulcans built, 19 survive today. None are airworthy, although three (XH558, XL426 and XM655) are in taxiable condition. All but four survivors are located in the United Kingdom. Of the four  Vulcans deployed in Operation Black Buck during the Falklands War – XM597, XM598, XM607 and XM612 – all survive today.

Surviving aircraft 
All locations are in the United Kingdom, unless otherwise stated.

References

Avro Vulcan
Avro Vulcan